Aprominta aga is a moth of the family Autostichidae. It is found on the Aegean Islands and in Turkey.

References

Moths described in 1962
Aprominta
Moths of Europe
Moths of Asia